Short is a South Korean television series starring Kang Tae-oh, Yeo Hoe-hyun, and Kim Do-yeon. The series aired on OCN every Monday and Tuesday at 21:00 (KST).

Synopsis 
Two people who never fit in met on the cold ice! A special drama about a novice short track speed skater reaching the top of the world is a drama about a young boy who has grown up to become a member of the world's highest speed skating team.

Cast

Main
 Kang Tae-oh as Kang Ho-young
 Yeo Hoe-hyun as Park Eun-ho

Supporting 
 Kim Do-yeon as Yoo Ji-na
  as Maeng Man-hee
 Noh Jong-hyun as Maeng Man-bok
  as Son Seung-tae
  as Man-bok's mother
  as Park Hoon
  as Kim Joong-bae
  as Kang Ho-dong
 Yang Dae-hyuk as Skater
 Kim Wook as Trainer Oh

Ratings
In this table,  represent the lowest ratings and  represent the highest ratings.

Notes

References

External links 
  

OCN television dramas
Korean-language television shows
2018 South Korean television series debuts
2018 South Korean television series endings